Bainshole is a farm in Aberdeenshire, Scotland.

References

Villages in Aberdeenshire